Animal sacrifice is the ritual killing and offering of one or more animals, usually as part of a religious ritual or to appease or maintain favour with a deity. Animal sacrifices were common throughout Europe and the Ancient Near East until the spread of Christianity in Late Antiquity, and continue in some cultures or religions today. Human sacrifice, where it existed, was always much rarer.

All or only part of a sacrificial animal may be offered; some cultures, like the ancient and modern Greeks, eat most of the edible parts of the sacrifice in a feast, and burnt the rest as an offering. Others burnt the whole animal offering, called a holocaust. Usually, the best animal or best share of the animal is the one presented for offering.

Animal sacrifice should generally be distinguished from the religiously prescribed methods of ritual slaughter of animals for normal consumption as food.

During the Neolithic Revolution, early humans began to move from hunter-gatherer cultures toward agriculture, leading to the spread of animal domestication. In a theory presented in Homo Necans, mythologist Walter Burkert suggests that the ritual sacrifice of livestock may have developed as a continuation of ancient hunting rituals, as livestock replaced wild game in the food supply.

Prehistory
Ancient Egypt was at the forefront of domestication, and some of the earliest archeological evidence suggesting animal sacrifice comes from Egypt. However,  animal sacrifice was not a central practice of Egyptian religion, but was rather a peripherical occurrence that happened away from worshippers. The oldest Egyptian burial sites containing animal remains originate from the Badari culture of Upper Egypt, which flourished between 4400 and 4000 BCE. Sheep and goats were found buried in their own graves at one site, while at another site gazelles were found at the feet of several human burials. According to Herodotus, later Dynastic Egyptian animal sacrifice became restricted to livestock – sheep, cattle, swine and geese – with sets of rituals and rules to describe each type of sacrifice.

At Gath, archeological evidence indicates that the Canaanites imported sacrificial sheep and goats from Egypt rather than selecting from their own livestock. At the Minoan settlement of Phaistos in ancient Crete, excavations have revealed basins for animal sacrifice dating to the period 2000 to 1700 BCE. However, remains of a young goat were found in Cueva de la Dehesilla (es), a cave in Spain, related to a funerary ritual from the Middle Neolithic period, dated to between 4800 and 4000 BCE.

Ancient Near East
Animal sacrifice was general among the ancient Near Eastern civilizations of Ancient Mesopotamia, Egypt and Persia, as well as the Hebrews (covered below).  Unlike the Greeks, who had worked out a justification for keeping the best edible parts of the sacrifice for the assembled humans to eat, in these cultures the whole animal was normally placed on the fire by the altar and burned, or sometimes it was buried.

Ancient Greece

Worship in ancient Greek religion typically consisted of sacrificing domestic animals at the altar with hymn and prayer. The altar was outside any temple building, and might not be associated with a temple at all. The animal, which should be perfect of its kind, is decorated with garlands and the like, and led in procession to the altar, a girl with a basket on her head containing the concealed knife leading the way.  After various rituals the animal is slaughtered over the altar, as it falls all the women present "must cry out in high, shrill tones".  Its blood is collected and poured over the altar. It is butchered on the spot and various internal organs, bones and other inedible parts burnt as the deity's portion of the offering, while the meat is removed to be prepared for the participants to eat; the leading figures tasting it on the spot. The temple usually kept the skin, to sell to tanners. The fact that the humans got more use from the sacrifice than the deity had not escaped the Greeks, and is often the subject of humour in Greek comedy.

The animals used are, in order of preference, bull or ox, cow, sheep (the most common), goat, pig (with piglet the cheapest mammal), and poultry (but rarely other birds or fish).  Horses and asses are seen on some vases in the Geometric style, but are very rarely mentioned in literature; they were relatively late introductions to Greece, and it has been suggested that Greek preferences in this matter go very far back.  The Greeks liked to believe that the animal was glad to be sacrificed, and interpreted various behaviours as showing this. Divination by examining parts of the sacrificed animal was much less important than in Roman or Etruscan religion, or Near Eastern religions, but was practiced, especially of the liver, and as part of the cult of Apollo. Generally, the Greeks put more faith in observing the behaviour of birds.  For a smaller and simpler offering, a grain of incense could be thrown on the sacred fire, and outside the cities farmers made simple sacrificial gifts of plant produce as the "first fruits" were harvested.  Although the grand form of sacrifice called the hecatomb (meaning 100 bulls) might in practice only involve a dozen or so, at large festivals the number of cattle sacrificed could run into the hundreds, and the numbers feasting on them well into the thousands.  The enormous Hellenistic structures of the Altar of Hieron and Pergamon Altar were built for such occasions.

The evidence of the existence of such practices is clear in some ancient Greek literature, especially in Homer's epics. Throughout the poems, the use of the ritual is apparent at banquets where meat is served, in times of danger or before some important endeavor to gain the favor of the gods. For example, in Homer's Odyssey Eumaeus sacrifices a pig with prayer for his unrecognizable master Odysseus. However, in Homer's Iliad, which partly reflects very early Greek civilization, not every banquet of the princes begins with a sacrifice.

These sacrificial practices, described in these pre-Homeric eras, share commonalities to the 8th century forms of sacrificial rituals. Furthermore, throughout the poem, special banquets are held whenever gods indicated their presence by some sign or success in war. Before setting out for Troy, this type of animal sacrifice is offered. Odysseus offers Zeus a sacrificial ram in vain. The occasions of sacrifice in Homer's epic poems may shed some light onto the view of the gods as members of society, rather than as external entities, indicating social ties. Sacrificial rituals played a major role in forming the relationship between humans and the divine.

It has been suggested that the Chthonic deities, distinguished from Olympic deities by typically being offered the holocaust mode of sacrifice, where the offering is wholly burnt, may be remnants of the native Pre-Hellenic religion and that many of the Olympian deities may come from the Proto-Greeks who overran the southern part of the Balkan Peninsula in the late third millennium BCE.

In the Hellenistic period after the death of Alexander the Great in 323 BCE, several new philosophical movements began to question the ethics of animal sacrifice.

Scythians
According to the unique account by the Greek author Herodotus (c. 484–c. 425 BCE), the Scythians sacrificed various kinds of livestock, though the most prestigious offering was considered to be the horse. The pig, on the other hand, was never offered in sacrifice, and apparently the Scythians were loath to keep swine within their lands. Herodotus describes the Scythian manner of sacrifice as follows:

Herodotus goes on to describe the human sacrifice of prisoners, conducted in a different manner.

Ancient Rome

The most potent offering in Ancient Roman religion was animal sacrifice, typically of domesticated animals such as cattle, sheep and pigs. Each was the best specimen of its kind, cleansed, clad in sacrificial regalia and garlanded; the horns of oxen might be gilded. Sacrifice sought the harmonisation of the earthly and divine, so the victim must seem willing to offer its own life on behalf of the community; it must remain calm and be quickly and cleanly dispatched.

Sacrifice to deities of the heavens (di superi, "gods above") was performed in daylight, and under the public gaze. Deities of the upper heavens required white, infertile victims of their own sex: Juno a white heifer (possibly a white cow); Jupiter a white, castrated ox (bos mas) for the annual oath-taking by the consuls. Di superi with strong connections to the earth, such as Mars, Janus, Neptune and various genii – including the Emperor's – were offered fertile victims. After the sacrifice, a banquet was held; in state cults, the images of honoured deities took pride of place on banqueting couches and by means of the sacrificial fire consumed their proper portion (exta, the innards). Rome's officials and priests reclined in order of precedence alongside and ate the meat; lesser citizens may have had to provide their own.

Chthonic gods such as Dis pater, the di inferi ("gods below"), and the collective shades of the departed (di Manes) were given dark, fertile victims in nighttime rituals. Animal sacrifice usually took the form of a holocaust or burnt offering, and there was no shared banquet, as "the living cannot share a meal with the dead". Ceres and other underworld goddesses of fruitfulness were sometimes offered pregnant female animals; Tellus was given a pregnant cow at the Fordicidia festival. Color had a general symbolic value for sacrifices. Demigods and heroes, who belonged to the heavens and the underworld, were sometimes given black-and-white victims. Robigo (or Robigus) was given red dogs and libations of red wine at the Robigalia for the protection of crops from blight and red mildew.

A sacrifice might be made in thanksgiving or as an expiation of a sacrilege or potential sacrilege (piaculum);
a piaculum might also be offered as a sort of advance payment; the Arval Brethren, for instance, offered a piaculum before entering their sacred grove with an iron implement, which was forbidden, as well as after.
The pig was a common victim for a piaculum.

The same divine agencies who caused disease or harm also had the power to avert it, and so might be placated in advance. Divine consideration might be sought to avoid the inconvenient delays of a journey, or encounters with banditry, piracy and shipwreck, with due gratitude to be rendered on safe arrival or return. In times of great crisis, the Senate could decree collective public rites, in which Rome's citizens, including women and children, moved in procession from one temple to the next, supplicating the gods.

Extraordinary circumstances called for extraordinary sacrifice: in one of the many crises of the Second Punic War, Jupiter Capitolinus was promised every animal born that spring (see ver sacrum), to be rendered after five more years of protection from Hannibal and his allies. The "contract" with Jupiter is exceptionally detailed. All due care would be taken of the animals. If any died or were stolen before the scheduled sacrifice, they would count as already sacrificed, since they had already been consecrated. Normally, if the gods failed to keep their side of the bargain, the offered sacrifice would be withheld. In the imperial period, sacrifice was withheld following Trajan's death because the gods had not kept the Emperor safe for the stipulated period. In Pompeii, the Genius of the living emperor was offered a bull: presumably a standard practise in Imperial cult, though minor offerings (incense and wine) were also made.

The exta were the entrails of a sacrificed animal, comprising in Cicero's enumeration the gall bladder (fel), liver (iecur), heart (cor), and lungs (pulmones). The exta were exposed for litatio (divine approval) as part of Roman liturgy, but were "read" in the context of the disciplina Etrusca. As a product of Roman sacrifice, the exta and blood are reserved for the gods, while the meat (viscera) is shared among human beings in a communal meal. The exta of bovine victims were usually stewed in a pot (olla or aula), while those of sheep or pigs were grilled on skewers. When the deity's portion was cooked, it was sprinkled with mola salsa (ritually prepared salted flour) and wine, then placed in the fire on the altar for the offering; the technical verb for this action was porricere.

Celtic peoples
There is evidence that ancient Celtic people sacrificed animals, almost always livestock or working animals, as part of ancient Celtic religion. The idea seems to have been that ritually transferring a life-force to the Otherworld pleased the gods and established a channel of communication between the worlds. Animal sacrifices could be acts of thanksgiving, appeasement, to ask for good health and fertility, or as a means of divination. It seems that some animals were offered wholly to the gods (by burying or burning), while some were shared between gods and humans (part eaten and part set aside).

Archaeologists have found evidence of animal sacrifice at some Gaulish and British sanctuaries, and at the Irish site Uisneach. Accounts of Celtic animal sacrifice come from Roman and Greek writers. Julius Caesar and Strabo wrote of the Gauls burning animal sacrifices in a large wickerwork figure, known as a wicker man, while Pliny the Elder wrote of druids performing a 'ritual of oak and mistletoe' which involved sacrificing two white bulls.

Some animal sacrifice or ritual slaughter continued among Celtic peoples long after they converted to Christianity. Until the 19th century, on St. Martin's Day (11 November) in rural Ireland a rooster, goose or sheep would be slaughtered and some of its blood sprinkled on the threshold of the house. It was offered to Saint Martin, and was eaten as part of a feast. Bull sacrifices at the time of the Lughnasa festival were recorded as late as the 18th century at Cois Fharraige in Ireland (where they were offered to Crom Dubh) and at Loch Maree in Scotland (where they were offered to Saint Máel Ruba).

Germanic peoples

Animal sacrifice, or blót, was an important ritual in Old Norse religion. The blood was sprinkled on altars, idols and the walls of temples. A blót was made at seasonal festivals as well as at funerals, before battles and perilous journeys, or after the conclusion of business between traders.

In the 11th century, Adam of Bremen wrote that human and animal sacrifices were made at the Temple at Gamla Uppsala in Sweden. He wrote that every ninth year, nine men and nine of every animal were sacrificed and their bodies hung in a sacred grove.

Abrahamic traditions

Judaism

A  was an animal sacrifice, such as a bull, sheep, goat, or a dove that underwent shechita (Jewish ritual slaughter). Sacrifices could also consist of grain, meal, wine, or incense.

The Hebrew Bible says that Yahweh commanded the Israelites to offer offerings and sacrifices on various altars. The sacrifices were only to be offered by the hands of the Kohanim. Before building the Temple in Jerusalem, when the Israelites were in the desert, sacrifices were offered only in the Tabernacle. After building Solomon's Temple, sacrifices were allowed only there. After the Temple was destroyed, sacrifices was resumed when the Second Temple was built until it was also destroyed in 70 CE. After the destruction of the Second Temple sacrifices were prohibited because there was no longer a Temple, the only place allowed by halakha for sacrifices. Offering of sacrifices was briefly reinstated during the Jewish–Roman wars of the second century CE and was continued in certain communities thereafter.

The Samaritans, a group historically related to the Jews, practice animal sacrifice in accordance with the Law of Moses.

Christianity

Christianity has long expressly opposed all forms of animal sacrifice, and the practice's "very possibility ... has been generally rejected as unreasonable and hostile to Christian theology". Most Christian denominations believe that the sacrificial death of Jesus Christ permanently abolished animal sacrifice, primarily based on the teaching in the Epistle to the Hebrews that Jesus was the "Lamb of God" to whom all ancient sacrifices pointed. Most Christian sects believe that the "bloodless" sacrifice of the Eucharist, or Lord's Supper, entirely replaces the Old Testament system of sacrifices. Consequently, animal sacrifice is rarely practiced in Christianity.

Despite this opposition, a few rural Christian communities sacrifice animals (which are then consumed in a feast) as part of worship, especially at Easter.  The animal may be brought into the church before being taken out again and killed. Some villages in Greece sacrifice animals to Orthodox saints in a practice known as kourbania. Sacrifice of a lamb, or less commonly a rooster, is a common practice in Armenian Church, and the Tewahedo Church of Ethiopia and Eritrea. This tradition, called matagh, is believed to stem from pre-Christian pagan rituals. Additionally, some Mayans following a form of Folk Catholicism in Mexico today still sacrifice animals in conjunction with church practices, a ritual practiced in past religions before the arrival of the Spaniards.

Islam

Muslims engaged in the Hajj (pilgrimage) are obliged to sacrifice a lamb or a goat or join others in sacrificing a cow or a camel during the celebration of the Eid al-Adha, an Arabic term that means "Feast of Sacrifice", also known as al-Id al-Kabir (Great Feast), or Qurban Bayrami (Sacrifice Feast) in Turkic influenced cultures, Bakar Id (Goat Feast) in Indian subcontinent and Reraya Qurben in Indonesia. Other Muslims not on the Hajj to Mecca also participate in this sacrifice wherever they are, on the 10th day of the 12th lunar month in the Islamic calendar. It is understood as a symbolic re-enactment of Abraham's sacrifice of a ram in place of his son. Meat from this occasion is divided into three parts, one part is kept by the sacrificing family for food, the other gifted to friends and family, and the third given to the poor Muslims. The sacrificed animal is a sheep, goat, cow or camel. The feast follows a communal prayer at a mosque or open air.

The animal sacrifice during the Hajj is a part of nine step pilgrimage ritual. It is, states Campo, preceded by a statement to intention and body purification, inaugural circumambulation of the Kaaba seven times, running between Marwa and Safa hills, encampment at Mina, standing in Arafat, stoning the three Mina satanic pillars with at least forty nine pebbles. Thereafter, animal sacrifice, and this is followed by farewell circumambulation of the Kaaba. The Muslims who are not on Hajj also perform a simplified ritual animal sacrifice. According to Campo, the animal sacrifice at the annual Islamic festival has origins in western Arabia in vogue before Islam. The animal sacrifice, states Philip Stewart, is not required by the Quran, but is based on interpretations of other Islamic texts.

The Eid al-Adha is major annual festival of animal sacrifice in Islam. In Indonesia alone, for example, some 800,000 animals were sacrificed in 2014 by its Muslims on the festival, but the number can be a bit lower or higher depending on the economic conditions. According to Lesley Hazleton, in Turkey about 2,500,000 sheep, cows and goats are sacrificed each year to observe the Islamic festival of animal sacrifice, with a part of the sacrificed animal given to the needy who did not sacrifice an animal. According to The Independent, nearly 10,000,000 animals are sacrificed in Pakistan every year on Eid. Countries such as Saudi Arabia transport nearly a million animals every year for sacrifice to Mina (near Mecca). The sacrificed animals at Id al-Adha, states Clarke Brooke, include the four species considered lawful for the Hajj sacrifice: sheep, goats, camels and cattle, and additionally, cow-like animals initialing the water buffalo, domesticated banteng and yaks. Many are brought in from north Africa and parts of Asia.

Other occasions when Muslims perform animal sacrifice include the 'aqiqa, when a child is seven days old, is shaved and given a name. It is believed that the animal sacrifice binds the child to Islam and offers protection to the child from evil.

Killing of animals by dhabihah is ritual slaughter rather than sacrifice.

Hinduism

Practices of Hindu animal sacrifice are mostly associated with Shaktism, Shaiva Agamas and in currents of folk Hinduism called Kulamarga strongly rooted in local tribal traditions. Animal sacrifices were carried out in ancient times in India. Some later minor Puranas forbid animal sacrifice though the upapurana, Kalika Purana, describes it in detail.

Shaktism Traditions 

Animal sacrifices are performed mainly at temples following the Shakti school of Hinduism where the female nature of Brahman is worshipped in the form of Kali and Durga. These traditions are followed in parts of eastern states of India at Hindu temples in Assam and West Bengal India and Nepal where goats, chickens and sometimes water buffalos are sacrificed. 

Animal sacrifice is a part of Durga puja celebrations during the Navratri in eastern states of India. The goddess is offered sacrificial animal in this ritual in the belief that it stimulates her violent vengeance against the buffalo demon. According to Christopher Fuller, the animal sacrifice practice is rare among Hindus during Navratri, or at other times, outside the Shaktism tradition found in the eastern Indian states of West Bengal, Odisha and Assam. Further, even in these states, the festival season is one where significant animal sacrifices are observed. In some Shakta Hindu communities, the slaying of buffalo demon and victory of Durga is observed with a symbolic sacrifice instead of animal sacrifice.

Animal sacrifice en masse occurs during the three-day-long Gadhimai festival in Nepal. In 2009 it was speculated that more than 250,000 animals were killed while 5 million devotees attended the festival. However, this practise was later banned in 2015.

Rajput Traditions 
The Rajput of Rajasthan worship their weapons and horses on Navratri, and formerly offered a sacrifice of a goat to a goddess revered as Kuldevi – a practice that continues in some places. The ritual requires slaying of the animal with a single stroke. In the past this ritual was considered a rite of passage into manhood and readiness as a warrior. The Kuldevi among these Rajput communities is a warrior-pativrata guardian goddess, with local legends tracing reverence for her during Rajput-Muslim wars.

The tradition of animal sacrifice is being substituted with vegetarian offerings to the Goddess in temples and households around Banaras in Northern India.

Folk Traditions 
In some sacred groves of India, particularly in Western Maharashtra, animal sacrifice is practiced to pacify female deities that are supposed to rule the Groves.

In India, ritual of animal sacrifice is practised in many villages before local deities or certain powerful and terrifying forms of the Devi. In this form of worship, animals, usually goats, are decapitated and the blood is offered to deity often by smearing some of it on a post outside the temple. For instance, Kandhen Budhi is the reigning deity of Kantamal in Boudh district of Orissa, India. Every year, animals like goat and fowl are sacrificed before the deity on the occasion of her annual Yatra/Jatra (festival) held in the month of Aswina (September–October). The main attraction of Kandhen Budhi Yatra is Ghusuri Puja. Ghusuri means a child pig, which is sacrificed to the goddess every three years. Kandhen Budhi is also worshipped at Lather village under Mohangiri GP in Kalahandi district of Orissa, India. (Pasayat, 2009:20–24).

The religious belief of Tabuh Rah, a form of animal sacrifice of Balinese Hinduism includes a religious cockfight where a rooster is used in religious custom by allowing him to fight against another rooster in a religious and spiritual cockfight, a spiritual appeasement exercise of Tabuh Rah. The spilling of blood is necessary as purification to appease the evil spirits, and ritual fights follow an ancient and complex ritual as set out in the sacred lontar manuscripts.

Trantrik Traditions 
Human sacrifice is also mentioned in Hinduism in the Kalika Purana. Chapters 67 through 78 of the text constitute the Rudhiradhyaya, which discusses bali (animal sacrifice) and of Vamacara Tantrism. The Rudhiradhyaya section is notable for its uncommon discussion of human sacrifice. The text states that a human sacrifice may be performed to please the goddess, but only with the consent of prince before a war or cases of imminent danger. However, it was not until 2014 when the National Crime Records Bureau (NCRB) started collecting data on human sacrifice. According to the bureau, there were 51 cases of human sacrifice spread across 14 states between 2014 and 2016. The alleged case of human sacrifice was recorded as late as 2020.

East Asian traditions

Han Chinese

Ancient China 
During Shang and Zhou Dynasty, the nobles used to practice a complicated and hierarchical sacrificial system and only the king could sacrifice to heaven and earth and the four sacred mountains including Mount Tai including his nine temples for his family. The Dukes sacrificed to the alter of land and grain and to the various rivers and streams and mountains in there territory and there family temples.The common person didn't have a temple but sacrificed to there father or grandfather or relevant family in there apartment or house and could only sacrifice to family because of the burden of the luxurious animals. The noble would sacrifice pig's goats or sheep cows mainly oxen dogs or wild dogs and other livestock at different times of the year; in bad years the sacrifices were less. 

The ancient kings, Confucius and Confucian scholars framed the sacrificing scale of every strata from the Zhou system, not including human sacrifice, in The Book of Rites. The names of the offering scales from honorable to low are 'Tai-lao'(太牢), 'Shao-lao'(少牢), 'Te-sheng'(特牲), 'Te-shi'(特豕), 'Te-tun'(特豚), 'Yu'(魚), 'La'(臘), 'Dou'(豆) and else. The Tai-lao class, now only practiced in the ceremony of worshipping Huang Di or Confucius, use whole cows, whole goats and whole pigs in Taiwan
 

It is said Hou ji offered a sacrifice with lamb millet and southern wood and black millet whine with fragrant herbs mainly southern wood.

Modern-day China 
Buddhism prohibits all forms of killing, rituals, sacrifices and worship and Taoism generally prohibit killing of animals. In Kaohsiung, Taiwan, animal sacrifices are banned in Taoist temples.

Some animal offerings, such as fowl, pigs, goats, fish, or other livestock, are accepted in some Taoism sects and beliefs in Chinese folk religion. The offerings would be placed at the altar or the temple after being slaughtered. The amount sacrificed is up to the worshippers, who can eat all of the offerings after the rite. In folk religion some regions believe that high-status deities prefer vegetarian food more, while ghosts, low-status gods, and other unknown supernatural spirits like meat. Therefore, whole pigs, whole goats, whole chickens, and whole ducks will be sacrificed in the ghost festival. Some vegetarian believers make dummy pigs or dummy goats from vegetarian food like bread or rice for sacrifice.

Japan 
Before Buddhism came to Japan, some Shinto festivals included deer, horse, and green pheasant sacrifice.
Iomante (イオマンテ), sometimes written as Iyomante (イヨマンテ), is an Ainu ceremony in which a brown bear is sacrificed.

Traditional Sub-Saharan and Afro-American religions
Animal sacrifice is regularly practiced in traditional African and Afro-American religions.

The U.S. Supreme Court's 1993 decision Church of Lukumi Babalu Aye v. City of Hialeah upheld the right of Santería adherents to practice ritual animal sacrifice in the United States of America.
Likewise in Texas in 2009, legal and religious issues that related to animal sacrifice, animal rights and freedom of religion were taken to the 5th U.S. Circuit Court of Appeals in the case of Jose Merced, President Templo Yoruba Omo Orisha Texas, Inc., v. City of Euless. The court ruling that the Merced case of the freedom of exercise of religion was meritorious and prevailing and that Merced was entitled under the Texas Religious Freedom and Restoration Act (TRFRA) to an injunction preventing the city of Euless, Texas from enforcing its ordinances that burdened his religious practices relating to the use of animals (see Tex. Civ. Prac. & Rem. Code § 110.005(a)(2)).

Austronesian

Utux 
Atayal, Seediq and Taroko people believe that bad-luck or punishments of 'Utux', which refers to any kind of supernatural spirits or ancestors, would infect the relatives. When a member in relatives has violated a taboo or met with misfortune, a ritual will be held. It must be done in the ritual to sacrifice a pig, which means the misfortune and sin would be washed away by the blood, and apologize to the Utux with gift.

See also
 Animal welfare
 Animal worship
 Anthrozoology
 Bans on ritual slaughter
 Folk religion
 Human sacrifice
 Religious abuse
 Self-flagellation
 Self-mutilation
 Slaughter offering

Notes

References

Bibliography
 
 
 Barik, Sarmistha (2009), "Bali Yatra of Sonepur" in Orissa Review, Vol.LXVI, No.2, September, pp. 160–62.
 Burkert, Walter (1972), Homo Necans pp. 6–22
 Burkert, Walter (1985), Greek Religion: Archaic and Classical, Harvard University Press, 
 Gihus, Ingvild Saelid. Animals, Gods, and Humans: Changing Ideas to Animals in Greek, Roman, and early Christian Ideas. London; New York: Routeledge, 2006.*Pasayat, C. (2003), Glimpses of Tribal an Folkculture, New Delhi: Anmol Publications Pvt. Ltd., pp. 67–84.
 Insoll, T. 2010. Talensi Animal Sacrifice and its Archaeological Implications. World Archaeology 42: 231–44
 Garnsey, Peter. Food and Society in Classical Antiquity. Cambridge: Cambridge University Press, 1999.
 
 Pasayat, C. (2009), "Kandhen Budhi" in Orissa Review, Vol.LXVI, No.2, September, pp. 20–24.
 Petropoulou, M.-Z. (2008), Animal Sacrifice in Ancient Greek Religion, Judaism, and Christianity, 100 BC to AD 200, Oxford classical monographs, Oxford University Press, .
 Rosivach, Vincent J. The System of Public Sacrifice in Fourth-Century Athens. Atlanta, GA: Scholars Press, 1994.

 
Animal rights
Cruelty to animals